Hutchinson is a center of media in south-central Kansas. The following is a list of media outlets based in the city.

Print

Newspapers
Collegian, weekly, Hutchinson Community College student newspaper
The Hutchinson News, daily

Radio
The following radio stations are licensed to and/or broadcast from Hutchinson:

AM

FM

Television
Hutchinson is the second principal city of the Wichita-Hutchinson, Kansas television market. The following television stations are licensed to and/or broadcast from the city:

References

Mass media in Kansas